Burras is a village in west Cornwall, England, United Kingdom, approximately five miles (8 km) south of Redruth on the B3297 road. It is in the civil parish of St Gluvias

References

External links

Villages in Cornwall